Shane Walker (born 1 March 1978) is an Australian former professional rugby league footballer who played in the 1990s and 2000s.

Background
Walker was born in Toowoomba, Queensland. While attending St Mary's High School in 1995, Walker was selected to play for the Australian Schoolboys team.

Playing career
Like his elder brother Ben and younger brother Chris, Walker started playing in the National Rugby League with the Brisbane Broncos. Having won the 2000 NRL Premiership, the Broncos traveled to England to play against 2000's Super League V Champions, St Helens R.F.C. for the 2001 World Club Challenge, with Walker playing from the interchange bench in Brisbane's loss. Walker later moved to the South Sydney club.  

In 2019, Walker spoke about his time at South Sydney saying "I went to Souths because Chris was going there. I’d heard how easy it was to get mixed up with the wrong crowd in Sydney. I thought there was a fair chance he could go off the rails… so I went down to help him out. I wasted my time, didn’t I? Ten weeks later he went to the Sydney Roosters".  

"I understood the significance of playing at Souths and the history. I recognised that I was lucky to wear the red and green play for Souths. You’d win a game, come up the escalators into the leagues club at Redfern and the place would be packed. The supporters would be in the auditorium and different guys would get up and talk and they’d be whipped into a frenzy. It was wonderful because in that Redfern area there are a lot of battlers. On top of that they fought like hell to get their team back in the comp. There was a lingering memory of that and the thought that perhaps their team might be taken away from them if they didn’t start winning. They were always proud of you – but they wanted a winning team to be happy about".

Post playing
Walker became co-head Coach of the Ipswich Jets who play in the Queensland Cup alongside his brother Ben.

Family
Walker is married to Katie Walker, a former Australian netball player. Their first child, a daughter, Kobi, was born in November 2006.

Footnotes

Sources

External links
Shane Walker at NRL Stats

1978 births
Living people
Australian rugby league coaches
Australian rugby league players
Brisbane Broncos players
Ipswich Jets coaches
Rugby league hookers
Rugby league players from Toowoomba
South Sydney Rabbitohs players
Shane 
South Sydney Rabbitohs captains